Brian Kevin McGlinchey (born 26 October 1977) is a Northern Irish former football defender. He made a total of 195 competitive appearances in an eleven-year career as a professional player before he was forced to retire in 2006, aged 28, due to injury. He also won 14 caps for Northern Ireland under-21s and one cap for the Northern Ireland B team.

Born in Derry, Northern Ireland, he started his career with Manchester City, but joined Port Vale in 1998 having never made a first team appearance at City. The next year he moved on to Gillingham, before he signed with Plymouth Argyle in 2000. He enjoyed a four-year spell with Plymouth, before he joined Torquay United in 2004, having spent some time on loan at the club the previous year. He stayed with Torquay until his retirement two years later. His honours included three promotion campaigns, once each with Gillingham, Plymouth, and Torquay.

Career

Manchester City and Port Vale
McGlinchey started his career with Manchester City in 1995, but never made a first team appearance in his three seasons with the club. In June 1998, he was signed by Port Vale manager John Rudge. He played 15 First Division games for "Valiants" during the 1998–99 season, bagging his first senior goal in a 2–1 defeat at Oxford United on 21 November 1998.

Gillingham
He was released by manager Brian Horton, and subsequently joined Peter Taylor's Second Division side Gillingham in August 1999. He started just six games in the 1999–2000 promotion season, and did not feature in the play-off final victory over Wigan Athletic. He made just one appearance in the First Division under new boss Andy Hessenthaler, before he left Priestfield Stadium, dropping down two tiers to the Third Division with Plymouth Argyle in December 2000.

Plymouth Argyle
He featured 22 times at left-back in 2000–01, as Paul Sturrock's "Pilgrims" posted a mid-table finish. He then made 29 league appearances in 2001–02, as Plymouth topped the Third Division table; his contribution was limited after he broke his foot. He was limited to 21 appearances at Home Park in 2002–03 by new signing Hasney Aljofree, and played no part of the club's success in 2003–04. He was instead loaned out to Third Division side Torquay United in October 2003, with the deal being made permanent in January 2004. A poll in 2019 saw him voted the club's 19th greatest ever full-back by fans, who nicknamed him "Mad Dog".

Torquay United
He played 34 league games in 2003–04, as the "Gulls" secured promotion into League One. Manager Leroy Rosenior could not keep the Plainmoor outfit in the third tier, however, and McGlinchey played 37 games as Torquay were relegated into League Two in 2004–05. He signed a 12-month contract in January 2005, but picked up a hamstring injury two months later. After a further medical examination in April his injury turned out actually to be a slipped disc. An operation was necessary, and in September 2005 he went under the knife. However this did not solve the problem and he was forced to retire in May 2006.

Later life
Having passed qualifications after subsidisations from the PFA during his time at Plymouth Argyle, McGlinchey became a mortgage adviser and went on to manage ten other mortgage advisors at Lloyds Bank in Plymouth. He also commentated on Plymouth Argyle games for BBC Radio Devon. However he continued to suffer with sciatic pain from the injury that ended his playing career and has a constant loss of feeling in his left leg. As of November 2018, he is married with three children.

Career statistics

Honours
Plymouth Argyle
Football League Third Division: 2001–02

Torquay United
Football League Third Division 3rd place promotion winner: 2003–04

References

1977 births
Living people
Sportspeople from Derry (city)
Association footballers from Northern Ireland
Northern Ireland under-21 international footballers
Northern Ireland B international footballers
Association football fullbacks
Manchester City F.C. players
Port Vale F.C. players
Gillingham F.C. players
Plymouth Argyle F.C. players
Torquay United F.C. players
English Football League players